HNoMS Garm was the third destroyer built for the Royal Norwegian Navy, and was a Draug class destroyer. Garm was constructed several years after her two sister ships, but to the same plans. She was built at the naval shipyard in Horten, with yard number 107.

Reactivation at the outbreak of the Second World War
Garm was mothballed after she became obsolete, but was recommissioned 28 August 1939 and took part in the defence of Norway after the German invasion in 1940. She was deployed to the 2nd Naval District's 1st destroyer division, a district covering an area roughly the same as the Vestlandet and Trøndelag regions.

Neutrality duties and the Altmark Incident
On 15 February 1940 Garm was the third and final Royal Norwegian Navy warship to search the German tanker and POW ship  after she entered Norwegian territorial waters up until the Altmark Incident. Garm transported the commanding admiral of the 2nd Naval District, Admiral Carsten Tank-Nielsen, to the German vessel, then in the Hjeltefjord, so could personally approve the decision to let the ship proceed.  After this final cursory inspection Garm  let the German ship continue southwards.

Norwegian Campaign service
On 9 April 1940 Garm was stationed at Norway's second largest city, Bergen, and the vessel operated in the Sognefjord after the Germans had occupied Bergen.

Defence of Bergen
During the German attack on Bergen Garm intercepted the last ship of the enemy flotilla, the cruiser , and tried to carry out a torpedo attack. This failed due to the distance between the two ships being to great for a quick surprise attack by the tiny Norwegian destroyer. After a number of near misses from the German guns Garm broke off her attack and fled to the north, pursued by Luftwaffe bombers.

Sinking in the Sognefjord
She was sunk by a direct hit from Luftwaffe bombers while anchored near her sister ship  at their Sognefjord base of Bjordal on 26 April.

Five German bombers attacked the two destroyers and one of the around thirty bombs dropped hit Garm right behind the front funnel, detonating two of her torpedoes and some other ammunition. The ship was almost broken in half by the explosion and burned for hours before sinking. All members of the crew had abandoned ship when the attack came as she had no effective anti-aircraft weapons to defend herself with, hence no casualties were endured during Garms sinking.

References

Sources

External links
 Naval History via Flix: KNM Draug, retrieved 29 January 2006 

Draug-class destroyers
Maritime incidents in April 1940
Ships built in Horten
World War II destroyers of Norway
World War II shipwrecks in the Norwegian Sea
1913 ships
Destroyers sunk by aircraft
Ships sunk with no fatalities
Ships sunk by German aircraft
Naval magazine explosions